is a subway station in Bunkyō, Tokyo, Japan, operated by Tokyo Metro. Its station number is Y-11. The station opened on 30 October 1974. The station was named after a nearby Buddhist temple of the same name.

Lines
Gokokuji Station is served by the Tokyo Metro Yūrakuchō Line.

Station layout
The station, which is underground, consists of an island platform and two sets of tracks.

There are elevators between ground level and the ticket gate level and between the ticket gate level and platform level. There are also escalators between the ticket gate level and platform level. Along with multifunction toilets, these facilities are meant to make the station barrier free.

As part of a plan to install half-height platform screen doors on the entire Yūrakuchō Line, construction on the doors in the station was begun in mid-2010, and they have been in use since 26 March 2011.

Stations of Tokyo Metro
Tokyo Metro Yurakucho Line
Railway stations in Tokyo
Railway stations in Japan opened in 1974